Sete de Setembro is the Independence Day of Brazil.

Sete de Setembro may also refer to:

Places
 Sete de Setembro, Rio Grande do Sul, Brazil
 Sete de Setembro River, a river in Mato Grosso, Brazil
 Avenida Sete de Setembro, a road in Salvador, Bahia, Brazil
 Praça Sete de Setembro, a square in Belo Horizonte, Minas Gerais, Brazil

Other uses
 Clube Desportivo Sete de Setembro, an association football team in Dourados, Mato Grosso do Sul, Brazil
 Sete de Setembro Esporte Clube, an association football team in Garanhuns, Pernambuco, Brazil
 Brazilian ironclad Sete de Setembro, a wooden-hulled warship